Jorge Leonardo Rondón Hernandez (born February 16, 1988) is a Venezuelan professional baseball pitcher for the Leones de Yucatán of the Mexican League. He has previously played in Major League Baseball (MLB) for the St. Louis Cardinals, Colorado Rockies, Baltimore Orioles, and Pittsburgh Pirates, and in Nippon Professional Baseball (NPB) for the Chunichi Dragons.

Career

St. Louis Cardinals
Jorge Rondón began pitching professionally for the Cardinals when he was 18.  From 2006 to 2011, he played on various rookie league and A-level teams.  He received his first promotion to the Class AA Springfield Cardinals in 2011.  The promotion coincided with increased strikeouts per 9 innings pitched (K/9) rates.  With Palm Beach of the Florida State League that year, he posted a then-professional high of 9.1 K/9 in  innings pitched (IP).  He yielded a 4.05 earned run average (ERA), 29 hits and 13 walks (BB).

Rondón split the 2012 season between Springfield and the Triple-A affiliate, the Memphis Redbirds, posting a 3.49 ERA in 49 innings with 50 strikeouts.  On October 30, 2012, the Cardinals added Rondón to the 40-man roster to prevent him from becoming a minor league free agent.

The club optioned him to AAA-Memphis on March 11, 2013.  He spent the entire 2013 season at Memphis, appearing in 51 games, pitching 67 innings and allowing a 3.06 ERA.  He allowed 72 hits, 37 BB and struck out 42 (SO).

The Cardinals recalled Rondón and Eric Fornataro from Memphis on April 17, 2014, when they moved Joe Kelly to the 15-day disabled list (DL). However, he did not appear in a game before being optioned to AAA to clear a roster spot for top prospect Oscar Taveras.

Colorado Rockies
Rondón was claimed off waivers by the Colorado Rockies on November 3, 2014. He was designated for assignment by the Rockies in May 2015.

Baltimore Orioles
On May 10 he was claimed off waivers by the Baltimore Orioles.

Pittsburgh Pirates
Rondón was claimed off waivers by the Pittsburgh Pirates on October 26, 2015. He began the 2016 season with the Triple-A Indianapolis Indians, and was promoted to the major leagues on June 19. On June 24, Rondón was designated for assignment.

Chicago White Sox
On December 13, 2016, Rondon signed a minor league deal with the Chicago White Sox. On January 7, 2017, Rondon was released to pursue pitching opportunities in Japan.

Chunichi Dragons
Following his release from the White Sox, he signed with the Chunichi Dragons in Japan's Nippon Professional Baseball.

Return to White Sox
On January 11, 2018, Rondón signed a minor-league contract with the Chicago White Sox. He was released on May 10, 2018.

Rieleros de Aguascalientes
On January 10, 2020, Rondón signed with the Rieleros de Aguascalientes of the Mexican League. On April 22, 2020, Rondón was released. On March 15, 2021, Rondón re-signed with Aguascalientes.

Leones de Yucatán
On June 1, 2022, Rondón was traded to the Leones de Yucatán of the Mexican League.

See also
 List of Major League Baseball players from Venezuela

References

External links

1988 births
Living people
Albuquerque Isotopes players
Baltimore Orioles players
Birmingham Barons players
Chunichi Dragons players
Colorado Rockies players
Indianapolis Indians players
Johnson City Cardinals players
Leones de Yucatán players
Major League Baseball pitchers
Major League Baseball players from Venezuela
Memphis Redbirds players
Navegantes del Magallanes players
Nippon Professional Baseball pitchers
Norfolk Tides players
Palm Beach Cardinals players
Pittsburgh Pirates players
Quad Cities River Bandits players
Rieleros de Aguascalientes players
St. Louis Cardinals players
Springfield Cardinals players
Tigres de Aragua players
Venezuelan expatriate baseball players in Japan
Venezuelan expatriate baseball players in Mexico
Venezuelan expatriate baseball players in the United States
Venezuelan Summer League Cardinals players
People from Calabozo